The 2019 Los Cabos Open (also known as the Abierto Mexicano de Tenis Mifel presentado por Cinemex for sponsorship reasons) was an ATP tennis tournament played on outdoor hard courts. It was the 4th edition of the tournament, and part of the ATP Tour 250 series of the 2019 ATP Tour. It took place in Los Cabos, Mexico from July 29 through August 4, 2019.

Singles main-draw entrants

Seeds 

 Rankings are as of July 22, 2019.

Other entrants 
The following players received wildcards into the singles main draw:
  Lucas Gómez
  Thanasi Kokkinakis 
  Guido Pella

The following players received entry using a protected ranking into the singles main draw:
  Cedrik-Marcel Stebe
  Janko Tipsarević

The following players received entry from the qualifying draw:
  Dominik Köpfer
  Kwon Soon-woo
  Maxime Janvier
  Jason Jung

Withdrawals 
Before the tournament
  Juan Martín del Potro → replaced by  Grégoire Barrère

Doubles main-draw entrants

Seeds 

 Rankings are as of July 22, 2019.

Other entrants 
The following pairs received wildcards into the doubles main draw:
   Hans Hach Verdugo /  Dennis Novikov
   Gerardo López Villaseñor /  Cameron Norrie

Champions

Singles 

  Diego Schwartzman def.  Taylor Fritz, 7–6(8–6), 6–3

Doubles 

   Romain Arneodo /  Hugo Nys def.  Dominic Inglot /  Austin Krajicek, 7–5, 5–7, [16–14]

References

External links 
 

Los Cabos Open
2019 in Mexican tennis
2019
Los Cabos Open
Los Cabos Open